In 1975, Brisbane's first FM radio station began broadcasting from a studio at the University of Queensland Student Union.  4ZZ (later 4ZZZ) became a catalyst for the development of original music in the city. Bands such as The Saints, The Go-Betweens, gerrymander and the boundaries, The Riptides and The Laughing Clowns established an ecosystem for alternative music that continues to flourish.

Brisbane's nightlife today is a thriving and varied mix of pubs, clubs, themed bars, and various other venues. There are two main areas of interest: The "City" (CBD) and the "Valley" (Fortitude Valley). While the city typically consists of venues catering to those with a more traditional taste in music or atmosphere, the Valley typically offers a drastically different, more cosmopolitan selection of places. The Brisbane City Council has tried to preserve the Valley as an entertainment precinct with the introduction of Valley Special Entertainment Precinct:

Following consultation with residents, music venues and commercial business operators within Fortitude Valley, the Valley Special Entertainment Precinct commenced on 1 July 2006. Its introduction is one of the first steps in achieving the aims of the Valley Music Harmony Plan.

Music

In the early 1990s, many young people were either studying or unemployed. Sharehousing with friends in old Queenslander-style housing of inner-city Brisbane, pre-gentrification, was the cheapest option to move out of home. Generation X identified strongly with film and music, but most especially music. Independent, alternative music was on the rise, globally and locally, and Brisbane's 'indie' music credentials were noteworthy. It was the birthplace of pioneering public radio station 4ZZZ in the mid-1970s, and produced famous bands such as The Saints and The Go-Betweens.

All kinds of music can be found in Brisbane's thriving live scene, from Dance to rock, pop and hip hop. Most venues are found in the Valley and surrounding areas since the popular Mary Street and Brisbane Festival Hall city venues were closed. Notable venues in the Valley include The Zoo and Ric's Cafe which both opened in 1992, The Arena, The Tivoli, The Fort, The Step Inn, The Empire Hotel, Black Bear Lodge, King Lear's Throne, The Brightside, The Crow Bar and The Press Club. 

The Rev closed down in September 2006. The Alley Bar closed down in March 2008. 

In 2023, bar and live music venue O'Skulligan's on Warner Street, Fortitude Valley announced that due to noise complaints they would no longer be hosting live music events in their bar. The last night of live music was held on 

11th February 2023 as part of the 2023 Mountain Goat Valley Crawl and the final band to perform was Dog God. 

Brisbane is home to a number of national music festivals including Future Music Festival, Jet Black Cat's Nine Lives Festival, Stereosonic, FOMO, Wildlands, Mountain Goat Valley Crawl, Soundwave, St Jerome's Laneway Festival and Valley Fiesta. Livid was also a home-grown alternative rock music festival held annually from 1989 to 2003.

Brisbane's live music scene has long been supported by independent record stores such as Rocking Horse Records which originally opened in 1975, Catalogue Music, Jet Black Cat Music, Kill the Music and Skinny's Music, and Brisbane music can be seen and heard online at Before Hollywood or Raw Audio - online TV for Brisbane Music. 

Rave Magazine was a free weekly magazine which covered the entertainment scene in Brisbane from 1991 to 2012, printing 1047 issues within it's lifespan. Time Off was a free weekly music magazine that started at the University of Queensland and progressed to a city wide free magazine. The magazine was incorporated and rebranded into The Music in 2013 along with other Australian music magazines Drum Media and Inpress. The Music's print edition was put on hold due to the COVID-19 Pandemic. Scene Magazine, later Scenester, is a free monthly national music and entertainment magazine. Since starting in 1999, Scenester has now become a digital-first company, but still distributes 12,500 print magazines throughout Brisbane, Ipswich, Toowoomba, Sunshine Coast and the Gold Coast.

The Brisbane Philharmonic Orchestra is a community orchestra based in Brisbane established in 1999 by Colin Hardcastle (violin) and Gareth Orley (trumpet).

Brisbane Referenced in Popular Music

Brisbane is featured in the song It's Hot in Brisbane but it's Coolangatta, recorded in 1953 by Gwen Ryan, Claude Carnell's Orchestra and additional vocals from Doug Roughton's Hokey Pokey Club.

A vast majority of Brisbane bars, pubs and R.S.L.s are named in The Chat's song I've Been Drunk in Every Pub in Brisbane off of their 2022 album Get Fucked. In order the pubs listed are: The Zoo (Fortitude Valley), The Boundary Hotel (West End), Wynnum R.S.L. (Wynnum), The Breakfast Creek Hotel (Albion), The Grand Central Hotel (Central Station, Brisbane), The Caxton (Petrie Terrace) and The Stock Exchange (Brisbane).

The Mangroves are a Brisbane based indie rock that primarily releases songs about the city and suburbs of Brisbane, as well as it's culture. Their live shows are a celebration of Brisbane culture including cutouts of the Brisbane 66 route bus, copies of the Courier Mail being thrown into the crowd during their song "Is it True or Did You Read it In the Courier Mail?" and debates which side of Brisbane is the best. Songs of theirs include "What's Better Than Brisbane?", "Red Hill Sharehouse", "Expo 88", "New Farm Park", "Pig City", "2032" and "Northside Southside". On their second album, It's the Humidity, they recorded a cover of Elvis' "Viva Los Vegas", changing the lyrics to "Viva Brisvegas". The band was created on an episode of the Brisbane based podcast, Unpacking Brisbane.

Violent Soho from Mansfield, Queensland reference the major Brisbane road Cleveland Road in their song "Liars" off of their seminal 2013 album Hungry Ghost.

Venues
The Queen Street Mall in the CBD offers nightclubs and bars, as well as the Conrad Treasury Casino. Nightclubs in the city include Strike Bowling, a nightclub with bowling lanes, and the lounge bar Jade Buddha. More conventional bars include The Victory. Mana Bar is cocktail bar and video gaming lounge in Fortitude Valley.

RSL clubs and local pubs around the suburbs occasionally have live acts. The Bearded Lady in the West End is a venue that is home to local, national and international independent music, of all genres of music ranging from metal to country.

Most major concerts are held in the Brisbane Entertainment Centre in Boondall, the Brisbane Convention & Exhibition Centre adjacent to the South Bank Parklands or the centrally located Riverstage. Other major events (including raves) are hosted at the RNA Showgrounds (due to its massive size and under-utilization when not hosting the Ekka) and more recently, Suncorp Stadium. Queensland Sport and Athletics Centre at Nathan has hosted a number of music concerts. The Princess Theatre in Woolloongabba hosts concerts from independent bands and is an affiliate of the Tivoli The Brisbane Powerhouse is an iconic venue that hosts a range of music events.
Cloudland was a famous Brisbane music and dancing venue located in Bowen Hills. The venue hosted thousands of dances and concerts in the 50s, 60s and 70s and was demolished in 1982. Brisbane Festival Hall hosted performances for many major tours by visiting overseas artists including The Beatles on 28 June 1964. 

Cloudland was a famous Brisbane music and dancing venue located in Bowen Hills. The venue hosted thousands of dances and concerts in the 50s, 60s and 70s and was demolished in 1982. Brisbane Festival Hall hosted performances for many major tours by visiting overseas artists including The Beatles on 28 June 1964.

Singers and musicians based in Brisbane

See also

Brisbane Punk Rock

References

External links
 Embracing the “dark” - Brisbane’s Gothic nightclub scene- John Oxley Library, State Library of Queensland
 The Zoo turns 30! (A brief history of Gen X in Brisbane)
 Time Off Digital Story and Sean Sennett Oral History - State Library of Queensland
 Rocking Horse Records Digital Story and Warwick Vere Oral History, State Library of Queensland
 Iconic Brisbane and Ipswich music scene digital stories and oral histories, State Library of Queensland
 Street Life: posters and their role in the Brisbane music scene 1975-1995, State Library of Queensland
 Memories of The Playroom with Jaime Cramp, State Library of Queensland
 You can't sit down: photographic portraits of Brisbane musicians, State Library of Queensland

Culture of Brisbane